Ulphia (also Ulphe, Olfe, Wulfe, Wolfia, or Wulfia and other variants; d. 8th century AD) of Amiens is a Christian saint, venerated particularly at Amiens. She was said to be a young girl living on the banks of the Noye in the who became a hermit at what would become Saint-Acheul, near Amiens in the Kingdom of the Franks, under the spiritual direction of Saint Domitius (Domice).  At the end of her life, she formed and directed a community of religious women at Amiens.  Her feast day is January 31.

Legend states that Ulphe placed the frogs in the area around her hermitage (which was built in a swampy area) under interdict as a result of their loud croaking, which kept her awake at nights.  Thus, in her iconography, she is depicted as a young nun seated in prayer on a rock with a frog in the pool near her.

A 19th century hagiographer noted that the frogs in the area around the oratory of Saint Ulphe were, indeed, very quiet.  However, if these frogs were taken elsewhere, they became boisterous once again.

A statue of Ulphia stands in the portal of Amiens Cathedral and a painting of Ulphia with Saint Domitius by the 19th century painter Jean de Franqueville, hangs inside the cathedral.

Notes

External links 

 Saints of January 31: Ulphia
 Domitius (Domice)
 http://www.mcah.columbia.edu/Mcahweb/facade/footnotes.html

People from Amiens
French hermits
8th-century Frankish saints
Female saints of medieval France
8th-century Frankish women
Medieval French saints
711 births
750 deaths